Drei may refer to:
 Drei (Glashaus album), a 2005 album by pop band Glashaus
 Drei (Emika album) (stylised form: DREI), a 2015 album by electronic artist Emika
 Three (2010 film), a German film called Drei in German
 Drei Oesterreich, Austrian mobile phone provider

People with the surname 
 Alisa Drei (born 1978), Finnish figure skater
 José Luis Drei (born 1973), Brazilian football player
 Umberto Drei (1925–1996), Italian racing cyclist